Quarks & Leptons is the first EP by Oxide & Neutrino, released on 15 December 2013. It is the follow-up to their third album, 2nd Chance, released in 2007.

Track listing
"Marimba" (Main Vocal Mix)
"Kill Em' wid da Sound" (featuring Amy Steele)
"In the Morning" (featuring Zahra Palmer) 
"Crazy Life" (featuring Cash James)
"Horrible Animals"

References

2013 debut EPs
Oxide & Neutrino albums